The Mosaic Fragment with Man Leading a Giraffe is a mosaic from the 5th century CE, now held in the Art Institute of Chicago. The piece is Byzantine and originated in northern Syria or Lebanon. Mosaics of this type were commonly used to decorate wealthy family villas.

Background

Creation
Mosaics have a long history throughout the Mediterranean and later elsewhere. The Mosaic Fragment with Man Leading a Giraffe at the Art Institute of Chicago originated in either Syria or Lebanon. This region is rich with mosaics, an art form which uses small pieces of glass, stone, or any other hard colored material, referred to as “tesserae," to create larger images made up of these pieces created with stone in mortar. Rather than being created by a single artist, mosaic compositions were often designed by a patron and executed by multiple artisans from a single “workshop.”

Development
The earliest known mosaics are from Mesopotamia and date to the 3rd millennium BCE, consisting of pieces of colored stones, shells, and ivory, and further examples of “paved” paths with stone and shells existed throughout Africa.  Mosaics overall are most commonly found in places of wealth, such as the aforementioned palaces and temples. Later, during the Hellenistic period (323 BCE-31 BCE), the popularity of mosaics surged and they were found throughout personal villas from Africa to Britain. Many of the most famous mosaics are located in northern Africa and Syria, two of the richest provinces of the Roman Empire.  Most of these date from the 2nd to the 7th century CE, into which the piece at the Art Institute of Chicago fits well from the 5th century.

Function
Mosaics are found in the Levant after Roman tradition brought the style along with their control.  They were most commonly used to decorate floors due to their durability, and most mosaics discovered today are found in relatively intact condition, including the primary example here. Of course, these floors would have been durable without the presence of mosaic decoration, but the desire to enhance the appearance of spaces was paramount. Other pieces within the Roman provinces of the Levant which resemble the Art Institute mosaic are in an African style, such as that in Cilicia, Turkey from the 3rd c. AD. Both of these styles resemble the Man Leading a Giraffe mosaic, alluding to a connection in location, influence, or both. Scenes of animals in mosaics throughout the Levant were common in the Roman period.

Cultural Influence
The mosaic fragment was part of a much larger composition which covered the floor of a wealthy family villa. A related object from the same donor and region also specifies that the room within which the floor was located was likely semipublic, such as a reception or dining room. The text suggests that this image was once among several other examples of exotic animals, which giraffes were considered to be at that time since they were non-native to the Mediterranean region and were often only seen while being paraded around at public events. Giraffes were collected by Romans beginning with the first one being brought to Rome by Julius Caesar in 46 CE. Since the region in which this object originated had experienced Roman control prior to the making of the piece, this is a likely influence and possible reason for this particular image's creation.

Provenance

The Mosaic Fragment with Man Leading a Giraffe is a museum piece located in Gallery 153, the Ancient and Byzantine Gallery, at the Art Institute of Chicago. It is still in some ways used in its original intended way, aesthetic representation, but it has lost its function as a structural element. The piece is near the back corner of its gallery with like objects. Gallery 153 is arranged chronologically and so this work “belongs” in this location according to its place in time, and has an interactive iPad beside its display case to entice visitors to stop.

The work was a gift in 1993 from a Mrs. Robert B. Mayer. In 1989, just a few years before the accession of this particular piece, the donations of the Mayer family were discussed in an article in the Los Angeles Times. Robert B. Mayer was a founding member of the Chicago Museum of Contemporary Art and a member of the purchasing committee for the Art Institute. He and his wife Beatrice “Buddy” Mayer travelled the world, collecting art. Mrs. Mayer worked with children in Israel, and this particular mosaic fragment may have come into the Mayers’ possession because they had fallen in love with mosaics from the Middle Eastern region. Mr. Mayer died in 1974 and his collection of about 2,000 items was left to his wife . She established a program which actively loaned items from her private collection to colleges and museums, and she later sold several of the contemporary art pieces for millions of dollars.

Destruction
Due to the fact that many of these works survive into the present, they are available for the modern collector. While it is uncertain how this particular work was acquired and first sold, the fact that it is no longer attached to the structure it once belonged to means it was at some point removed. The removal of mosaics and other related art forms such as frescoes is extremely destructive. Because the works are permanently affixed to the structural elements they belong to, they must be cut away from their surfaces and broken into various pieces and would require extensive restoration. These fragments then enter the art market permanently removed from their original context, often anonymously through art dealers.

See also
Lod Mosaic Archaeological Center
 Basilica of San Vitale

References

Further reading
 Bowman, B. A. "Transnational Crimes Against Culture: Looting at Archaeological Sites and the ‘Grey’ Market in Antiquities," Journal of Contemporary Criminal Justice, 24 (2008): 225–42.
 Kennedy, Andy. "Dallas Museum Volunteers to Return Mosaic to Turkey," The New York Times (December 3, 2012).
 Nelson, Robert S. "Living on the Byzantine Borders of Western Art," Gesta 35/1 (1996): 3-11.
 Vogel, Susan. "Always True to the Object, in Our Fashion," Poetics and Politics of Museum Display (Smithsonian, 1991): 191-204.

External links
 The Art Institute of Chicago Mission and History
 Object Online Catalog Entry
 Video of Mosaic Conservation and Display at The Art Institute of Chicago

Collections of the Art Institute of Chicago
Byzantine mosaics
5th century in art
Giraffes in art